This is a list of the 25 tallest buildings in the U.S. state of Massachusetts outside of Boston, its capital and largest city. The U.S state of Massachusetts is a New England State north of New York and shares its border with Vermont, New Hampshire, Rhode Island, Connecticut and New York. The buildings listed below are monitored by the Board of Building Regulations and Standards of Massachusetts. 
Rankings are approximate; their accuracy cannot be guaranteed on account of uncertainties in the height data and the possibility of missing items.

See also 
 List of tallest buildings in Boston
 List of tallest buildings and structures in Cambridge, Massachusetts
 List of tallest buildings in Springfield, Massachusetts
 List of tallest buildings in Worcester, Massachusetts

References

Boston excluded